Shiva or  Shiv or Sivan or Shivan  is one of the principal deities of Hinduism. 

Shiva, Sheeva, or Siva may also refer to:

Religion
 Shiva (Judaism), the Jewish ritual of mourning for seven ("shiva") days after the burial of an immediate relative
 Shiva,  the supreme soul of Brahma Kumaris religion
 Shivā (ending with long 'a'), another name of Parvati, Shiva's consort

Places
 Shiva, Iran, a village in Gilan Province, Iran
 Shiva crater, an apparent impact crater in the Indian Ocean, possibly associated with the Cretaceous–Tertiary extinction event
 Shiva Temple (Grand Canyon), a summit in Arizona, US

People
 Shiva (actor) (born 1983), Tamil actor
 Shiva (rapper) (born 1999), Italian rapper
 Vandana Shiva (born 1952), physicist, philosopher, ecofeminist, environmental activist, and writer
 Cosma Shiva Hagen (born 1981), German actress
 Shiva Ahmadi (born 1975), Iranian-born American visual artist
 Shiva Ayyadurai (born 1963), Indian-born American scientist and entrepreneur
 Shiva Raichandani (b. 1993), Indonesian dancer

Arts, entertainment, and media

Fictional entities
 Sheeva, a Mortal Kombat character
 Shiva (Final Fantasy), a summonable ice elemental in the Final Fantasy franchise
 Shiva (Streets of Rage character), a character in the video game series
 Kaiyanwang, a.k.a. Shiva, a fictional character from 3×3 Eyes
 Shiva, the ultimate villain in the anime Legend of Heavenly Sphere Shurato
 Shiva, a fictitious strain of Ebola virus from Tom Clancy's novel Rainbow Six 
 Shiva, a Bengal tiger cared for and befriended by King Ezekiel in The Walking Dead franchise
 Shivans, the main antagonistic race in the Freespace series
 Lady Shiva, a DC Comics character
 Neosapien General Shiva, a character from the cartoon TV series Exosquad
 Shiva (Marvel Comics), a robotic Weapon X enforcer in Marvel Comics
 Shiva's Guard, a powerful artifact in the Warcraft III game Defense of the Ancients
 The Shiva, the award given to the league winners on the television series The League

Films
 Siva (1989 Tamil film), a film starring Rajinikanth
 Siva (1989 Telugu film), a film by director Ram Gopal Varma
 Shiva (1990 film), a remake of the Telugu film in Hindi by director Ram Gopal Varma
 Shiva (2006 film), another Hindi remake by Ram Gopal Varma
 Shiva (2008 film), by siblings Ronit and Shlomi Elkabetz
 Shiva (2012 film), a Kannada film starring Shivrajkumar

Literature
 Shiva trilogy, by Amish Tripathi, comprises: The Immortals of Meluha, The Secret of the Nagas, and The Oath of the Vayuputras

Shiva, a book by A. B. Yehoshua

Television
 Shiva (Fear the Walking Dead), season 2, episode 7 – and the midseason finale episode of – Fear the Walking Dead
 "Shiva" (NCIS), a season 10 episode of NCIS
 Shiva (TV series), an Indian animated action television series currently airing on Nickelodeon Sonic and Nick HD+

Music
 "Siva" (song), by Smashing Pumpkins
 Shiva, a British dance band featuring vocalist Louise Dean

Computing
 SheevaPlug, a small form factor computer
 Shiva Corporation, a manufacturer of computer network products

Science
 Shiva, a strain of Cannabis sativa subsp. indica
 Shiva Hypothesis, scientific theory concerning impact events
 Shiva laser, built at the Lawrence Livermore National Laboratory in the late 1970s
 Shiva Star, a high-powered plasma weapon research

Other uses
 Shiva (horse) (born 1995), a Thoroughbred racehorse

See also
 Shiba (disambiguation)
 Shiv (disambiguation)
 Shivaji (1630–1680), founder of the Maratha Empire
 Shiver
 Shiwa (disambiguation)
 Sieve
 Siva (disambiguation)
 Siwa (disambiguation)
 Yeshiva
 1170 Siva